Lingadipa is a village in Myinmu Township in the southeast of the Sagaing Division in Burma.  It is located west of Myinmu, near Allagappa on the northern bank of the Irrawaddy River. The village was occupied by the British Indian Army on 13–14 February 1944 during World War II.

References

External links
Maplandia World Gazetteer

Populated places in Sagaing District